Andres Kõpper (stage name: NOËP; born on 22 March 1990) is an Estonian musician and film and television director.

He has been a member of the band Tenfold Rabbit. He has electronic music soloproject called NOËP.

Filmography
Films and TV serials:
 2012 "Nurjatud tüdrukud" (TV serial; director)
 2012 "Bad Hair Friday" (feature film; director)
 2015 "Restart" (TV serial; director)

References

Living people
1990 births
Estonian musicians
Estonian film directors
Tallinn University alumni